Oh, to Be on the Bandwagon! is a 1972 Danish drama film directed by Henning Carlsen. It was entered in the 22nd Berlin International Film Festival. The film was selected as the Danish entry for the Best Foreign Language Film at the 45th Academy Awards, but was not accepted as a nominee. For her role as Elly,  won the Bodil Award for Best Actress in a Supporting Role.

Cast 
 Karl Stegger – Søren
 Birgitte Bruun – Caja (as Birgitte Price)
 Otto Brandenburg – Lasse
 Jesper Langberg – Svend
  – Ib
  – Elly
 Gyrd Løfquist – Café owner
  – Annie
 Lene Vedsegård – Ragnhild
 Ellen Margrethe Stein – Ib's mother
  – Lone, the wife of Lasse
 Hans W. Petersen – Mr Hansen
 Ebba Amfeldt – Old lady
  – Gerda, the wife of Søren
 Martin Lichtenber – Jens, the son of Søren and Gerda

See also 
 List of submissions to the 44th Academy Awards for Best Foreign Language Film
 List of Danish submissions for the Academy Award for Best Foreign Language Film

References

External links 
 
 
 

1972 drama films
1972 films
Danish drama films
1970s Danish-language films
Films directed by Henning Carlsen